Lemyra neurica is a moth of the family Erebidae. It was described by George Hampson in 1911. It is found in India (Sikkim, Assam, Darjiling) and Bhutan.

References

 

neurica
Moths described in 1911